Susana Rodríguez (born 1980) is a Mexican visual artist who has had a number of solo exhibitions and has participated in various group exhibitions.
Her work often consists of installations.

Biography

Susana Rodríguez was born in Guadalajara, México in 1980.
She attended the  University of Guadalajara, where she studied visual arts. 
She was a founding member of the Colectivo de Acción y Creación Artística (Collective of Action and Artistic Creation). 
In 2006-2007 FONCA (Fondo Nacional para la Cultura y las Artes - National Fund for Culture and the Arts) awarded her a grant for young creators.

Work

In 2008 Rodríguez held a solo exhibition at the Museo Raúl Anguiano in Guadalajara called El día de la langosta (The day of the locust).
The theme of the show was the destructive power of humans, and the way in which a small action such as killing a fly can trigger effects in distant regions.
It draws on Chaos theory and the Chinese proverb that the flapping wings of a butterfly can be felt across the world, and also has religious undertones.
The exhibition attempts the difficult task of depicting the moment of destruction and what happens as a result.
It starts with a car that has crashed into a huge tree, represented by an acrylic painting on one wall of the room.
It continues with a collage showing the tiny figures of angels and cherubs who live with birds and wild animals, and moves on
to a dark room where a fly is hovering in video format.
The artist chose the title because a locust is a very passive and quiet creature, but turns into a savage beast when its habitat is disturbed, causing further destruction in a domino effect.  
A critic has described the work as "silent poetry", using images rather than words.

Rodríguez was inspired by the flash fiction story El emigrante by Luis Felipe Lomelí to create an installation named ¿Olvida usted algo? – ¡Ojalá! that opened in August 2009 at the Casa del Lago in Mexico City.
This work explores the idea of a building that perhaps has been destroyed during a storm, but where traces remain of the time when it was inhabited.
The outdoor installation is constructed of bricks, concrete, ceramic tiles and a wooden door. 
The work is ambiguous, leaving it to the viewer to interpret whether the building was destroyed, is in the process of being built, or is complete.
The artist has said she addresses the dialectic between construction and destruction as an event that helps us understand and accept the transformation of life as inevitable.

In July 2009 Rodríguez participated with Emily Landon and Katie Murray in the group exhibition The Communication Consideration Coordination at the Kate Werble Gallery in New York.  For the exhibition she constructed a "container" that combined sculpture, mural painting and cut vinyl to make a 3-dimensional scene that incorporated the gallery façade.
She returned to the Kate Werble Gallery for the exhibition Pinch Pots and Pyramids (October–December 2009), with artists Liliane Lijn, Sam Moyer, Ryan Reggiani, Halsey Rodman and Molly Smith.  Her work at this show was based on broken and reassembled ceramic cups.

Exhibitions

Solo exhibitions include: 

2005: Mil meses, Arena México Arte Contemporáneo
2007: Melody, Museo de la Ciudad, Querétaro
2008: El día de la langosta (The day of the locust), Museo Raúl Anguiano, Guadalajara
2009: -Olvida usted algo? – Ojalá (Did you forget something? - Hopefully), Casa del Lago Juan José Arreola, Mexico City

Group exhibitions in which she has participated include:
2006: Performance, Pianonobile, Switzerland
2006: Asimétrica, Instituto Cultural Cabañas, Guadalajara
2006: El equilibrio y sus derivados (Balance and its derivatives), Casa del Lago Juan José Arreola, Mexico City
2007: Standing on one foot, Triangle Projects Space, Texas
2008: The best art work in the World (or the portrait of the artist), Charro Negro Galeria, Zapopan
2009: The communication, coordination, consideration, Kate Werble Gallery, New York
2009: Hecho en casa (Homemade), Museo de Arte Moderno, Mexico City (2009)
2009: Bing Bang y otras teorias de Evolución (Big Bang and other theories of evolution), Border, Ciudad de México
In January–March 2010 her work was included in the Mexicali Biennial at the Otis Ben Maltz Gallery.

References

1980 births
Living people
Artists from Guadalajara, Jalisco
20th-century Mexican women artists
21st-century Mexican women artists